Daniel Hugh Boone (born January 14, 1954) is a former professional baseball pitcher. He pitched parts of three seasons in Major League Baseball, appearing in 1981, 1982, and 1990. He is probably best known for the eight-year gap between his major league stints, and the improbable comeback that led him to his time with the Baltimore Orioles in 1990.

Draft history 
Coming out of Cal State Fullerton, Boone was selected in the 2nd round of the 1976 Major League Baseball Draft by the then-California Angels. This was actually the fifth time Boone had been drafted, as he had been selected after each of his four years in college as well as the secondary phase draft in January 1976. It was also the third time he was drafted by the Angels, who selected him in both 1973 and 1974, but he only signed after this draft.

NL career 
Boone's early promise went unfulfilled for several years, as he washed out of the Angels' system when he was released at the end of spring training in 1980. He was signed just three days later by the San Diego Padres, where he made his major league debut the following April. Boone pitched in 37 games for the Padres in 1981, winning 1 game, losing none, and collecting two saves with a decent 2.84 ERA.

Boone began the next season with the Padres as well, but pitched sparingly, making only 10 appearances over the first two months of the season. On June 8, he was traded to the Houston Astros for infielder Joe Pittman, and after a handful of appearances in June was returned to the minor leagues. After a September call-up, he started the 1983 season back in the minors, and was released in June.

MLB Comeback 
Boone signed a minor league contract with the Milwaukee Brewers, spending about a year in their farm system before being released once again. For the next five years, he dropped off the radar of American professional baseball.

Then, in 1989, a new league started that gave Boone a new lease on his career: the Senior Professional Baseball Association. Boone signed on with the Bradenton Explorers, where he showed off a new pitch in his arsenal: the knuckleball. He pitched well enough for them (4-3, 3.16 ERA) to get a contract offer from the Orioles, and in September 1990 he was back in the majors. He pitched in four games, including his first-ever major league start against the Cleveland Indians on September 30, in which he did not receive a decision.

Boone's comeback drew some attention, and he even was accorded "Rookie Prospect" status in the 1991 Score baseball card set at the age of 36. However, his first major league start also turned out to be his last major league appearance, as he did not make the Orioles team that spring, and after a second stint with the Explorers Boone's career was well and truly over.

See also

List of knuckleball pitchers

References

External links
, or Retrosheet, or Pura Pelota (Venezuelan Winter League)

1954 births
Living people
American expatriate baseball players in Canada
Amarillo Gold Sox players
Baltimore Orioles players
Baseball players from Long Beach, California
Bradenton Explorers players
Cardenales de Lara players
Cal State Fullerton Titans baseball players
Cerritos Falcons baseball players
Daytona Beach Explorers players
El Paso Diablos players
Hawaii Islanders players
Houston Astros players
Knuckleball pitchers
Major League Baseball pitchers
Navegantes del Magallanes players
American expatriate baseball players in Venezuela
Oklahoma City 89ers players
Rochester Red Wings players
Salinas Angels players
Salt Lake City Gulls players
San Diego Padres players
Tucson Toros players
Vancouver Canadians players
Anchorage Glacier Pilots players
Alaska Goldpanners of Fairbanks players